Monte Corrasi is a mountain in the territory of Oliena,  Province of Nuoro, eastern Sardinia, Italy.

It is a massif formed by white limestone and dolomite.

Corrasi